Blue Creek is an unincorporated community in Kanawha County, West Virginia, United States. Blue Creek has a post office with ZIP code 25026.

References

Unincorporated communities in Kanawha County, West Virginia
Unincorporated communities in West Virginia